Frank Earl Birch (November 11, 1883) was a college football and basketball referee who first introduced signals. In 1920, he passed out cards to coaches and the press with a code of twelve gestures. He was a graduate of Earlham College. He married Margaret Johnson. He was also once mayor of Sterling, Illinois.

References

1883 births
1948 deaths
College football officials
Earlham Quakers men's basketball players
College men's basketball referees in the United States
Earlham Quakers baseball players
Earlham Quakers football players
Mayors of places in Illinois
People from Sterling, Illinois